The 2018 European Individual Speedway Junior Championship (also known as the 2018 Speedway European Under 21 Championship) was the 21st edition of the Championship.

The final was staged at Stralsund in Germany and was won by Dominik Kubera of Poland.

The U19 final was staged at Varkaus in Finland and was won by Mads Hansen of Denmark.

Under 21

Final
 14 September 2018
  Stralsund

Under 19
The final was staged at Varkaus in Finland and was won by Mads Hansen of Denmark.

Final
 11 August 2018
  Varkaus

See also 
 2018 Speedway European Championship

References

Individual Speedway Junior European Championship
2018 in speedway
2018 in German motorsport
International sports competitions hosted by Germany